Nuestra Señora del Rosario de Baruta is the seat of the Baruta Municipality in Miranda, Venezuela.

Further reading
History and culture (Spanish)
Geography (Spanish)

See also
Miranda State
El Hatillo Town
Baruta Municipality

Baruta Municipality
Populated places established in 1620
Populated places in Miranda (state)
1620 establishments in the Spanish Empire